Hotel Majestic is a historical hotel on the Avenue de Paris in Tunis, Tunisia. It was built in 1914 and is noted for its Art Nouveau architecture with a white facade and gently curved corners. The hotel is four storeys high and the first floor has a terrace. The hotel overlooks the Jardin Habib Thameur.

References

External links
 Official website

Majestic
Art Nouveau architecture in Tunisia
Majestic
Majestic
Majestic